Ivar Campbell (born 1904, died 1985), full name Donald Robert Ivar Campbell,  was a New Zealand screenwriter and film director. Son of Lt-Col Robert Ormus Campbell and Beatrice (née Cadell).

Personal life 
Born in New Zealand when his father was there approx. 1892–1910. He married Sheila Milligan on 14 July 1934 at Littleton Church, near Shepperton. In 1939 he was a farmer in Devon, living with his wife, Sheila (a film scenario writer) and widowed mother Beatrice. In 1950 he appears to own a fishing boat. 
In 1960, Campbell and his wife purchased Tiverton Castle in Devon which was inherited by his nephew, Angus, in 1985.
Sheila Campbell is credited as a writer on Belles of St Clements, Feather Your Nest and Expert Opinion.

Selected filmography
 Reunion (1932)
 Song of the Plough (1933)
 The Wishbone (1933)
 Paris Plane (1933)
 Doss House (1933)
 She Was Only a Village Maiden (1933)
 The Diplomatic Lover (1934)
 Bypass to Happiness (1934)
 Designing Women (1934)
 The Mad Hatters (1935)
 Expert's Opinion (1935)
 The Belles of St. Clements (1936)
 Grand Finale (1936)
 Feather Your Nest (1937)
 Captain's Orders (1937)
 Too Many Husbands (1938)

References

External links
 

New Zealand film directors
1904 births
Year of death missing
People from Ōtaki, New Zealand